Year 165 (CLXV) was a common year starting on Monday (link will display the full calendar) of the Julian calendar. At the time, it was known as the Year of the Consulship of Orfitus and Pudens (or, less frequently, year 918 Ab urbe condita). The denomination 165 for this year has been used since the early medieval period, when the Anno Domini calendar era became the prevalent method in Europe for naming years.

Events

By place

Roman Empire 
 A Roman military expedition under Avidius Cassius is successful against Parthia, capturing Artaxata, Seleucia on the Tigris, and Ctesiphon. The Parthians sue for peace.
 Antonine Plague: A pandemic  breaks out in Rome, after the Roman army returns from Parthia. The plague significantly depopulates the Roman Empire and China.
 Legio II Italica is levied by Emperor Marcus Aurelius.
 Dura-Europos is taken by the Romans.
 The Romans establish a garrison at Doura Europos on the Euphrates, a control point for the commercial route to the Persian Gulf. 
 Avidius Cassius takes Nisibis, and conquers the north of Mesopotamia. 
 Marcus Aurelius creates 4 legal districts (iuridici) in Italy (5 if Rome is included).

Asia 
 Sindae becomes ruler of the Korean kingdom of Goguryeo.

By topic

Religion 
 The philosopher Justin of Nablus is executed in Rome as a Christian. 
 Discourse to the Greek (Oratio ad Graecos), by the Syrian Tatian, is the first treatise on the evils of paganism in Christian literature.
</onlyinclude>

Births 
 Annia Faustina, Roman noblewoman (d. 218)
 Marcus Opellius Severus Macrinus, Roman emperor (d. 218)
 Mi Zhu (or Zizhong), Chinese official and advisor (d. 221)
 Shi Hui, Chinese official and statesman (d. 227)
 Tiberius Claudius Cleobulus, Roman politician (d. 213)

Deaths 
 Appian, Greek historian and writer (approximate date)
 Chadea, Korean ruler of Goguryeo (b. AD 71)
 Claudius Ptolemaeus, Greek astronomer (approximate date)
 Deng Mengnü (or Bo Mengnü), Chinese empress
 Elpinice, daughter of Herodes Atticus (b. AD 142)
 Justin Martyr, Christian apologist (b. AD 100)
 Peregrinus Proteus, Greek philosopher (b. AD 95)
 Taejodae, Korean ruler of Goguryeo (b. AD 47)

References 

 

als:160er#165